Estonia participated in the Eurovision Song Contest 2002 with the song "Runaway" written by Pearu Paulus, Ilmar Laisaar, Alar Kotkas and Jana Hallas. The song was performed by Sahlene. In addition to participating in the contest, the Estonian broadcaster Eesti Televisioon (ETV) also hosted the Eurovision Song Contest after winning the competition in 2001 with the song "Everybody" performed by Tanel Padar, Dave Benton and 2XL. ETV organised the national final Eurolaul 2002 in order to select the Estonian entry for the 2002 contest in Tallinn. Ten songs competed in the national final and "Runaway" performed by Sahlene was selected as the winner by an international jury panel.

As the host country, Estonia competed in the Eurovision Song Contest which took place on 25 May 2002. Performing during the show in position 8, Estonia placed third out of the 24 participating countries with 111 points.

Background 

The Estonian national broadcaster, Eesti Televisioon (ETV), broadcasts the event within Estonia and organises the selection process for the nation's entry. Since their debut, the Estonian broadcaster has organised national finals that feature a competition among multiple artists and songs in order to select Estonia's entry for the Eurovision Song Contest. The Eurolaul competition has been organised since 1996 in order to select Estonia's entry and on 6 November 2001, ETV announced the organisation of Eurolaul 2002 in order to select the nation's 2002 entry.

Before Eurovision

Eurolaul 2002 
Eurolaul 2002 was the ninth edition of the Estonian national selection Eurolaul, which selected Estonia's entry for the Eurovision Song Contest 2002. The competition consisted of a ten-song final on 26 January 2002 at the Linnahall in Tallinn, hosted by Marko Reikop and Karmel Eikner and broadcast on ETV.

Competing entries 
On 6 November 2001, ETV opened the submission period for artists and composers to submit their entries up until 3 December 2001. A record 90 submissions were received by the deadline—breaking the previous record of 80, set during the 2001 edition. A 10-member jury panel selected 10 finalists from the submissions and the selected songs were announced on 6 December 2001. Among the competing artists was previous Eurovision Song Contest entrant Ivo Linna, who represented Estonia in 1996 with Maarja-Liis Ilus. Gerli Padar has competed in previous editions of Eurolaul. The selection jury consisted of Meelis Kapstas (journalist), Jaan Elgula (musician), Jaan Karp (musician), Priit Hõbemägi (culture critic), Allan Roosileht (Star FM presenter), Aarne Saluveer (choir conductor), Maido Maadik (Eesti Raadio sound engineer), Hanna-Liina Võsa (singer), Karmel Eikner (journalist) and Priit Pajusaar (composer).

Final 
The final took place on 26 January 2002. Ten songs competed during the show and "Runaway" performed by Sahlene was selected as the winner by an international jury. A non-competitive public televote which registered 34,399 votes was also held and selected "Another Country Song" performed by Nightlight Duo and Cowboys as the winner. The international jury panel consisted of Nicki French (United Kingdom), L-G Alsenius (Sweden), Nuša Derenda (Slovenia), Louis Walsh (Ireland), Bo Halldórsson (Iceland), Manfred Witt (Germany), Marlain (Cyprus) and Moshe Datz (Israel).

At Eurovision
According to Eurovision rules, all nations with the exceptions of the bottom six countries in the 2001 contest competed in the final. As the host country, Estonia automatically qualified to compete in the Eurovision Song Contest 2002 on 25 May 2002. On 9 November 2001, a special allocation draw was held which determined the running order and Estonia was set to perform in position 8, following the entry from Russia and before the entry from Macedonia. Sahlene was joined on stage by five backing vocalists: Charlotte Berg, Jelena Juzvik, Joel Sahlin, Jüri Mazurtšak and Lena Olsson-Björkén, and Estonia finished in third place with 111 points.

The show was broadcast in Estonia on ETV with commentary by Marko Reikop. The Estonian spokesperson, who announced the Estonian votes during the show, was Ilomai Küttim "Elektra".

Voting

References

2002
Countries in the Eurovision Song Contest 2002
Eurovision